Saint-Martin-d'Entraunes (literally Saint-Martin of Entraunes;) is a commune in the Alpes-Maritimes department in southeastern France. It is located in the middle stretches of the Var valley, situated at the limits of the Mercantour National Park.

Population

In popular culture
It was included in the 2014 racing game Forza Horizon 2.

See also
Communes of the Alpes-Maritimes department
Col de la Cayolle

References

Communes of Alpes-Maritimes
Alpes-Maritimes communes articles needing translation from French Wikipedia